Ravnsbjerg Church (Danish: Ravnsbjergkirken) is a modern church located on the hill of Ravnsbjerg in Viby J. The church was designed by the Danish architect Christian Frederik Møller and his architectural firm C. F. Møller Architects as part of the new development of Aarhus in 1970, which resulted in the suburbs being moved out of the old city areas. The church's building materials are primarily red and brown bricks in combination with exposed bearing structures in wood. Sculptor Erik Heide created the church's wood and granite decorations.

See also 
 List of churches in Aarhus

External links

 Church website in Danish
 C. F. Møller Architects about Ravnsbjerg Church
 Parish website in Danish

Lutheran churches in Aarhus
Churches in the Diocese of Aarhus